The 1990 Preakness Stakes was the 115th running of the Preakness Stakes thoroughbred horse race. The race took place on May 19, 1990, and was televised in the United States on the ABC television network. Summer Squall, who was jockeyed by Pat Day, won the race by two and one quarter lengths over runner-up Unbridled.  Approximate post time was 5:33 p.m. Eastern Time. The race was run over a fast track in a final time of 1:53-3/5. The Maryland Jockey Club reported total attendance of 96,106, this is recorded as second highest on the list of American thoroughbred racing top attended events for North America in 1990.

Payout 

The 115th Preakness Stakes Payout Schedule

$2 Exacta:  (7–6) paid   $13.00

$2 Trifecta:  (7-6–9) paid   $46.80

The full chart 

 Winning Breeder: William Stamps Farish III; (KY)
 Final Time: 1:53.60
 Track Condition: Fast
 Total Attendance: 96,106

See also 

 1990 Kentucky Derby

References

External links 

 

1991
1990 in horse racing
1990 in American sports
1990 in sports in Maryland
Horse races in Maryland